Francesco Busacca better known as Cicciu or Ciccio Busacca (1925–1989) was born in Paternò, Province of Catania. He was one of the best known Sicilian ballad singers. Dario Fo, playwright and composer, wrote "Ci ragiono e canto N.3" for him.

References 

 Dario Fo biography at nobelprize.org
 Italian music history at worlddiscoveries.net
 Cicciu Busacca  at www.irsap-agrigentum.it

1925 births
1989 deaths
People from Paternò
20th-century Italian  male singers
20th-century guitarists
Musicians from the Province of Catania